Bruce Lee, My Brother (also known in the United Kingdom as Young Bruce Lee) is a 2010 Hong Kong biographical martial arts drama film directed by Raymond Yip, written, produced, and directed by Manfred Wong, and storied, produced, and narrated by Bruce Lee's real-life younger brother Robert Lee. Starring Aarif Rahman as Lee, Tony Leung Ka-fai and Christy Chung as Lee's parents, the film is based on the life of Bruce Lee in his teenage years to part of his adult years.

Plot
Bruce Lee, My Brother is a dramatic biopic of the eponymous martial arts legend as told by his younger brother, Robert Lee. Based directly from the book "Memories of Lee Siu-loong", which is authored by Lee's siblings (Phoebe, Robert, Agnes and Peter), it revolves around Bruce Lee's life as a rebellious adolescent in Hong Kong before he sets off for the USA and conquers the world at the age of 18 with only US$102 in his pocket.

As a young man, Bruce grew up in an affluent family.  Entering the film industry at an early age, he gained fame as a child actor.  Outside the home and studio, he was rebellious; he spent time engaging in street fights, dancing with lady friends, and hanging with his buddies, Kong and Unicorn, the latter a fellow child actor who later appeared in Fist of Fury and Way of the Dragon. Invincible as he is as a street fighter, Bruce's romantic escapades are not as smooth and successful. He is head-over-heels in love with Pearl, only to realize his mate Kong shares the same passion. At a cha-cha dancing tournament, Kong tells Bruce his intentions of leaving Pearl so Bruce himself can have her, damaging their friendship. Bruce is unable to come to terms with Kong.

Against his father's wishes, Bruce studies the Wing Chun martial arts style instead of Tai-chi and tastes his first public triumph at a tournament with his kung fu skills against a boxer, whom immediately seeks a rematch. Tasting victory again, Bruce learns from his opponent that Kong has become a drug addict and infiltrates the drug lord's den together with Unicorn to rescue Kong, but the drug dealers confront them.  Their actions lead to a long chase; although Bruce and his friends survive, Kong later dies trying to save his friends.  Bruce himself becomes the target of both the Triads and corrupted cops who want him in jail. To save his life, Bruce's father has no choice but to send him off to San Francisco, California.

Cast
 Aarif Rahman as Bruce Lee
 Tony Leung Ka-fai as Lee Hoi-chuen
 Christy Chung as Grace Ho
 Jennifer Tse as Cho Man-yee (Pearl Tso)
 Michelle Ye as Lee Hap-ngan (Eight Sister), Bruce Lee's aunt
 Jin Au-yeung as Unicorn Chan/Sloppy Cat
 Tan Hanjin as Skinny 
 Angela Gong Mi as Leung Man-lan (Margaret Leung)
 Zhang Yishan as Lau Kin-kong
 Wilfred Lau as Ngai
 Lee Heung-kam as Bruce Lee's grandmother
 Cheung Tat-ming as Fung Fung
 Cheung Siu-fai as Cho Tat-wah
 Johnson Yuen as Leung Sing-Bor
 Alex Yen as Charlie Owen
 Dada Lo as Phoebe Lee
 Leanne Ho as Agnes Lee
 Charles Ying as Peter Lee
 Dylan Sterling as Robert Lee
 Wong Chi-Wai as Ip Man

Accolades

References

External links
 
 
 News: Biopic Bruce Lee, My Brother out in November
 Bruce Lee, My Brother at Hong Kong Cinemagic

2010 films
2010 biographical drama films
2010 martial arts films
2010s Cantonese-language films
Films about Bruce Lee
Films directed by Raymond Yip
Films set in the 1940s
Films set in the 1950s
Films set in Hong Kong
Hong Kong biographical films
Hong Kong martial arts films
Jeet Kune Do films
Media Asia films
2010s Hong Kong films